World Aircraft Company was an American aircraft manufacturer of light-sport aircraft headquartered in Paris, Tennessee.

The company manufactures aircraft designed by South American engineer, Max Tedesco and intends to start production in 2014.

The company was dissolved in January 2018.

Aircraft

References

External links

Defunct aircraft manufacturers of the United States